Sensing is the present participle of the verb sense. It may also refer to:

 Myers-Briggs sensing, a cognitive function (measured by the Myers-Briggs Type Indicator assessment) that focuses on the tangible and concrete over the abstract and theoretical 
 Remote sensing a technique used is several scientific fields
 Sensor operation, the detection of a physical presence and the conversion of that data into a signal that can be read by an observer or an instrument

See also
Sense
Sense (disambiguation)
Sensory (disambiguation)